The Roman Catholic Vicariate Apostolic of Loango was a mission territory in Central Africa. It is now the Diocese of Pointe-Noire, in the Republic of the Congo.

History

Formerly included in the Kingdom of Congo, the Kingdom of Loango became independent towards the end of the sixteenth century, at which time it extended from the mouth of the Kwilou to that of the River Congo. By the treaties of 1885 all this country, over which Portugal had till then exercised a somewhat uncertain sway, became part of French Congo, except the enclave of Cabinda which still remained under Portuguese control.

Ecclesiastical administration

The transference of civil dominion affected the ecclesiastical distribution of the territory. By decree of 24 November 1886, the Vicariate Apostolic of French Congo, or Lower Congo, more properly Loango, was detached from that of Gaboon; and in 1890, as a result of further division, the Vicariate of Upper French Congo, or Ubangi, was erected. The three vicariates which made up French Congo — Gaboon, Loango, Ubangi — embraced an area, approximately, of one million square miles.

The Vicariate Apostolic of Loango lay to the south of that of Gaboon; on the west, it was bounded by the Atlantic; on the south, by the Massabi River, Cabinda, and Belgian Congo; to the east is the Vicariate of Ubangi, from which it is separated by the Djue River as far as the upper reaches of that river, and thence onward by a line drawn to meet the head waters of the Alima River.

The natives are Bantu people, speaking numerous dialects the most important of which is the Kivili. Amongst those contributed to the knowledge of the language were Mgr Carrie, the first Apostolic vicar, and Mgr Derouet, his successor.

The vicariate was in the charge of the Congregation of the Holy Ghost. The station at Loango was on the route to Brazzaville, and had a printing establishment. The seminary and house of novices  were at Mayumba, where Ignace Stoffel founded the mission in 1888.

Jean Derouet was of the Congregation of the Holy Ghost and of the Immaculate Heart of Mary, and titular Bishop of Camachus. He was born at Saint-Denis-de-Villenette, Diocese of Séez, Orne, France, 31 January 1866. Ordained in 1891, he went as missionary to the Congo, and in 1904 was named pro-Vicar Apostolic of Loango. He was chosen bishop on 19 December 1906; consecrated 3 February 1907, in the chapel of the Holy Ghost, at Paris; preconized on 18 April of the same year; and appointed Vicar Apostolic of Lower French Congo.

See also 
Catholic Church in the Republic of the Congo

References

Attribution

Loango
Catholic Church in the Republic of the Congo